The exposure scenario (sometimes referred as: ES) is a document of chemical safety which has to be prepared for substances that are manufactured/imported in quantities of more than 10 tonnes/year in/to the territory of the EU, and are considered to be hazardous or PBT/vPvB substances.

The aim of the ES
The exposure scenario is a system of conditions that describes that how a given substance (on its own or in mixtures/articles) is manufactured or used during its life cycle, and which control methods are prescribed/recommended by the manufacturer/importer/downstream user to avoid/reduce the human and environmental exposure.

The content of the ES
The exposure scenario must contain the appropriate risk assessment measures and operational conditions which ensure that all the risks arising from the use of the substance can be controlled appropriately.

Exposure scenarios may appear in an annex of the SDS, in which case the document is referred to as an 'extended SDS'.

Useful information
Main duties of the downstream users
Tasks for downstream users, who import substances, preparations or articles from outside of the EU

Regulation of chemicals in the European Union